Richard Fogarty  (12 December 1891 – 9 September 1980) was New Zealand rugby union player. He was a member of the All Blacks in 1914, playing in the loose forward and hooker positions.

Early life
Born in the Central Otago gold-mining settlement of Matakanui, Fogarty was educated at Christian Brothers School in Dunedin, where he played rugby union.

Senior rugby
Fogarty played for the Union club and represented Otago in 1914. He then played for the Hawera club and represented Taranaki from 1920 to 1922. He then shifted to Auckland where he played for College Rifles RFC. He represented Auckland in 1923 and 1924. He was a New Zealand trialist in 1924 and played in the New Zealand Services team in 1918, 1919 and 1920.

All Black
Fogarty was selected for the 1921 All Blacks. His two games for New Zealand were against the 1921 Springboks. He played in his usual position as a loose forward in the first test and as a hooker in the final test. The first test was won by New Zealand (13–5) and the second was a scoreless draw (0–0). Fogarty did not score any points for the All Blacks.

Military service
During World War I, Fogarty served with the New Zealand Rifle Brigade, rising to the rank of sergeant. He was awarded the Military Medal for gallantry in 1918.

Later life and death
Following the death of Frank Mitchinson in 1978, Fogarty was the oldest living All Black. He died in Dunedin in 1980 and was buried at Andersons Bay Cemetery.

References

1891 births
1980 deaths
Auckland rugby union players
Burials at Andersons Bay Cemetery
New Zealand international rugby union players
New Zealand military personnel of World War I
New Zealand recipients of the Military Medal
New Zealand rugby union players
Otago rugby union players
People educated at Trinity Catholic College, Dunedin
Rugby union hookers
Rugby union players from Otago
Taranaki rugby union players